BuzzBallz is an American brand of pre-mixed cocktail drinks.

History
The drink was invented by Merrilee Kick and her sons Alex and Andrew in 2009, who was then a high school teacher, in Dallas, Texas. The idea for the cocktail started with a spherical glass that Kick owned.

In a 2016 interview with Forbes, Kick described her difficulties raising money for her business, stating that she was told that she was unlikely to survive in a male-dominated industry. She said she "wouldn’t label [herself] as a feminist because [she] loves guys" and that women have "special skills that men don’t".

Reception
Matt Merkin of Liquor.com described the cocktails as "strong, cheap and ... a lot of fun" and the line of products to have created "an underground drinking phenomenon", stating that they have "colorful containers and equally colorful names". Albert Burneko of Deadspin described BuzzBallz as "the sad cocktail grenades you always wanted". Katie Orlady of the website Spoon University described the drink as a "blinding elixir" and "boozy orbs".

Marcie Seidel of the Drug Free Action Alliance, an Ohio-based substance abuse prevention group, described the 20% alcohol content of the cocktails to be "really scary" and said that the packaging, which targets young people, is concerning for them.

References

Cocktails
American alcoholic drinks
Premixed alcoholic drinks